Wu Changshuo (September 12, 1844 – November 29, 1927, also romanised as Wu Changshi), born Wu Junqing, was a Chinese calligrapher, painter, and seal artist of the late Qing Period.

Life
Wu was born into a scholarly family  in Huzhou, Zhejiang. In his twenties, Wu moved to Jiangsu Province and settled down in Suzhou. Prior to the collapse of the Great Qing, he served as an imperial official in Liaoning.

Initially, he devoted himself to poetry and calligraphy with a strong interest in early scripts. He also led the Xiling Seal Art Society, an academic organisation for Hangzhou-based seal artists. Wu started painting in his thirties. Only later did he consider himself a painter associated with the "Shanghai School." As a painter, he was noted for helping to rejuvenate the art of painting flowers and birds. He considered carving seals and doing paintings to be integrated to each other.

His work garnered him fame and he was highly regarded in Japan.

After his death, he was interred under the Chaoshan.

Gallery of Wu Changshi's artworks

Sources

Chinese Paintings in the Ashmolean Museum Oxford(162) Oxford 
Chinese culture site
Examples of his work at the Museum of Fine Arts Boston

External links

References 

1844 births
1927 deaths
19th-century Chinese calligraphers
Chinese seal artists
Painters from Zhejiang
People from Huzhou
Qing dynasty calligraphers
Qing dynasty painters
Republic of China calligraphers
Republic of China painters